The 2003 Copa Libertadores Final was a two-legged football match-up to determine the 2003 Copa Libertadores champion. It was contested by Argentine club Boca Juniors and Brazilian club Santos. The first leg of the tie was played on 25 June at Boca Juniors' venue, La Bombonera, with the second leg played on 2 July at Estádio do Morumbi in São Paulo.

During the final, both sides registered all of their local players. Boca Juniors won the series 5–1 on aggregate.

Qualified teams

Venues

Route to the finals

Final summary

First leg

|

|}

Second leg

|

|}

References

1
1
2003
l
2003
Santos FC matches